Edith Penelope Mary Lutyens (pseudonym Esther Wyndham; 31 July 1908 – 9 April 1999) was a British author who is principally known for her biographical works on the philosopher Jiddu Krishnamurti.

Early life
Mary Lutyens was born in London, the fourth and youngest daughter of the architect Edwin Lutyens, and his wife, Emily, the daughter of Robert Bulwer-Lytton, Viceroy of India, and the granddaughter of the writer and politician Edward Bulwer-Lytton. Mary was the younger sister of the composer Elisabeth Lutyens.

As a child, Lutyens spent time with her maternal grandmother Edith, the former vicereine, who lived at Knebworth, thirty miles from London, with her daughter the suffragette Constance Bulwer-Lytton. Edwin Lutyens had designed a dower house for his mother-in-law called Homewood.

As a result of her mother's interest in theosophy, Lutyens met Krishnamurti when she was a child: she knew him from 1911 until his death in 1986.

In the 1920s, her father was working on his buildings at Delhi.  Lutyens visited India with her mother and went to Australia, staying at The Manor, a centre run by Charles Webster Leadbeater in Mosman, New South Wales,  while Krishnamurti and his brother Nitya stayed at another house nearby. Lutyens stayed there for some time, which eventually provided her with material for her book Krishnamurti: The Years of Awakening.

Career
Apart from her works on Krishnamurti, Lutyens wrote biographies of John Ruskin, Effie Gray and her own family. In her book Millais and the Ruskins she put forward the controversial argument that Ruskin could not consummate his marriage because he was repelled by his wife's pubic hair.

She wrote novels under the pseudonym "Esther Wyndham" for the Mills & Boon and Harlequin Romance imprints.

Personal life
Lutyens married twice. Her first marriage, in 1930, to  Anthony Rupert Herbert Franklin Sewell, a stockbroker, produced one daughter, Amanda Lutyens Sewell, but ended in divorce in 1945. Her second marriage, in 1945, was to Joseph Gluckstein Links, art historian and royal furrier, and ended with his death in 1997.

Works 
Perchance to Dream, London: John Murray, 1935.
To be young : some chapters of autobiography, London: R. Hart-Davies, 1959 , 1989 edition: 
Effie in Venice: Effie Ruskin's Letters Home 1849–1852, London: John Murray, 1965, Pallas Athene (UK), 2001 edition: .
Millais and the Ruskins, London: John Murray, 1967, Vanguard Press in USA.
Krishnamurti: The Years of Awakening, London: John Murray, 1975, Shambhala Publications reprint edition 1997: . First installment of a three-volume biography, covers the period from Krishnamurti's birth in 1895 to 1933.
Krishnamurti: The Years of Fulfilment, London: John Murray, 1983, Farrar, Straus, Giroux paperback: , Avon Books 1991 reprint with US spelling  "Fulfillment": . Second volume of the Krishnamurti biography,  covers the years from 1933 to 1980.
Krishnamurti: The Open Door, London: John Murray, 1988, . Final volume of biography covers years 1980 to 1986, the end of Krishnamurti's life.
The Lyttons in India: An account of Lord Lytton's Viceroyalty, 1876–1880 London: John Murray, 1979, .
Edwin Lutyens: A Memoir, Academic Pr Canada Ltd, 1980, Black Swan, 1991 revised edition: .
The Boy Krishna, 1995, Krishnamurti Foundation Trust paperback: . Subtitled, "The First Fourteen Years in the Life of J. Krishnamurti".
Krishnamurti and the Rajagopals, 1996, Ojai, CA: Krishnamurti Foundation of America, .
J. Krishnamurti: A Life, 2005, Penguin Books India, . This book is a compilation of The Years of Awakening, The Years of Fulfilment, and The Open Door.

References

Sources
 Sarah Anderson. Obituary: Mary Lutyens. The Independent, 13 April 1999.
 Eric Page.  Obituary: Mary Lutyens, English Editor, Novelist and Biographer, 90 The New York Times, 17 April 1999.

1908 births
1999 deaths
Theosophy
English biographers
20th-century biographers
Pseudonymous women writers
Women romantic fiction writers
Lutyens family
20th-century pseudonymous writers